The Oman Ice Sports Committee (OISC) is the governing body of ice hockey in Oman. It joined the International Ice Hockey Federation in 2014 as an associate member, the fourth country from the Persian Gulf region to join the IIHF (United Arab Emirates, Kuwait, Qatar).

See also
Oman men's national ice hockey team

References

External links
Oman Ice Sports Committee
International Ice Hockey Federation
National Teams of Ice Hockey

 
Ice hockey governing bodies in Asia
Ice hockey
International Ice Hockey Federation members